National Popular Vote Inc. is a non-profit organization based in Los Altos, California, launched in 2006 by Barry Fadem and John Koza. Its purpose is "to study, analyze and educate the public regarding its proposed interstate compact providing for the nationwide popular election of the President of the United States," and it developed and champions the National Popular Vote Interstate Compact.

The proposal
The group's website describes their approach as follows:
"Nationwide popular election of the President can be implemented if the states join together to pass identical state laws awarding all of their electoral votes to the presidential candidate receiving the most popular votes in all 50 states and the District of Columbia. The proposed state legislation would come into effect only when it has been enacted, in identical form, by enough states to elect a President -- that is, by states possessing a majority (270) of the 538 electoral votes."

The group developed and champions the adoption of the National Popular Vote Interstate Compact, which is an agreement among a group of U.S. states and the District of Columbia to award all their electoral votes to whichever presidential candidate wins the overall popular vote in the 50 states and the District of Columbia. The compact is designed to ensure that the candidate who receives the most votes nationwide is elected president, and it would come into effect only when it would guarantee that outcome.

Progress

Within the first several months of its 2006 launch and media campaign, National Popular Vote's proposal began to make progress in various state legislatures. Early action occurred both in large Democratic strongholds California, New York, and Illinois, as well as in medium-sized swing and red states such as Colorado, Missouri, and Louisiana.

, 15 states and the District of Columbia have joined the compact; collectively, these jurisdictions control 196 electoral votes, which is 73% of the 270 required for the compact to take effect.

Advisory committee
 Hon. John B. Anderson (IL)
 Hon. Birch Bayh (IN)
 Hon. John Buchanan (AL)
 Hon. Tom Campbell (CA)
 Hon. Tom Downey (NY)
 Hon. David Durenberger (MN)
 Hon. Jake Garn (UT)

Notable newspaper endorsements
 Chicago Sun Times, March 1, 2006
 New York Times, March 14, 2006
 Minneapolis Star Tribune, March 27, 2006
 Sacramento Bee, June 3, 2006
 Los Angeles Times, June 5, 2006
 Miami Herald, November 5, 2008
 Boston Globe, April 19, 2009

See also
 National Popular Vote Interstate Compact
 United States Electoral College

References

External links
 

Election and voting-related organizations
Organizations established in 2006
2006 establishments in California
Electoral reform groups in the United States